The following is a list of monastic houses in Cumbria, England, a modern county including all of the former Cumberland and Westmorland and parts of Lancashire.

See also
 List of monastic houses in England

Notes

References

Bibliography

England in the High Middle Ages
Medieval sites in England
Lists of buildings and structures in Cumbria
Archaeological sites in Cumbria
 
Houses in Cumbria
Cumbria
Cumbria
Church of England church buildings in Cumbria